Al-Irshad Al-Islamiya Association is an organization in Indonesia engaged in educational and religious activities.  The organization was established on September 6, 1914 (15 Shawwal 1332 H). The date refers to the establishment of the first Al-Irshad school in Batavia. The organization had its own legal recognition from the Dutch colonial government on August 11, 1915.

History
According to Majlis Da'wah al-Irshad (al-Irshad Department of Preaching), the name Irshad referred to the name (the Association for Propaganda and Guidance) of the founder Rashid Rida who was from Egypt.

Al-Irshad Al-Islamiya is an Indonesian national Islamic organization. In terms of membership, as stated in the Articles of Association of Al-Irshad: "Citizens of the Republic of Indonesia who are Muslims who have grown up." The central figure of the establishment of Al-Irshad is Sheikh Ahmad as-Soorkati al-Ansari, a Sudanese scholar living in Mecca who came to Indonesia at the request of the Jamiat Kheir organization to become a teacher.

The founders are as follows:
Shaykh Ahmad Surkati 
Umar Mangush
Sa'id bin Salim Mash'abi 
Salih 'Ubayd 'Abdat
Salim bin 'Iwad Balwa'al

In its first period of development, the Irshadi movement was under the chairmanship of Salim bin 'Iwad Balwa'al and its administrative included Sheikh Muhammad 'Ubayd 'Abbud as secretary and Sa'id bin Salim Mash'abi as treasurer.  All the founders but Ahmad Surkati were rich merchants and businessmen in Jakarta.

Soon after the foundation of Irshadi movement Surkati handed over his school to this movement and became the principal of al-Irshad school. He was joined by one of the scholar of Hadramaut in Indonesia, Sheikh Muhammad 'Ubayd 'Abbud, and all his friends from abroad. In 1913 the Irshadi movement established the following schools:

 A three-year primary school ( Awwaliyah)
 A four-year elementary school (Ibtida'iyah)
 A two-year secondary school (tajhiziyah)
 A four-year school of teachers (mu'allimin)

Among the native Muslims supporting the effort were  Haji Ahmad Dahlan and Haji Zamzam.  Ahmad Dahlan was the member of Jamiat Kheir who then founded Muhammadiyah in 1912 and Haji Zamzam  later built PERSIS (Organization) in 1923.  This trio organizations basically have the similar spirits and efforts.

In the early days of the schools, most taught subjects were mostly related to Islamic sciences and Arabic language. The first Irshadi school of Jakarta had eleven teachers from abroad and only one Indonesian teacher (who teaches Indonesian language).

In 1917 two branches were open outside Jakarta, one in Surabaya and another one in Tegal.  The branch in Surabaya was run by Abu al-Fadl al-Ansari (Surkati's brother). This school hired two Egyptia teachers, Muhammad Murshidi and 'Abd al-Qadir al-Muhanna. In 1922 'Abd al-Qadir al-Muhanna was replaced by 'Umar b. Salim Hubays.  The branch school of al-Irshad in Tegal was opened and run by a student of Surkati, 'Abd Allah b. Salim al-Attas together with Shaykh Muhammad Nuh al-Ansari and another graduate of al-Irshad Jakarta, 'Ali Harharah. Shaykh AbÜ al-Fagl was also one of its teachers.

Organization
The Al-Irshad movement is based on the following five principles:
 To hold the doctrine of God's Unity by purifying devotions and prayers from their contamination by polytheistic elements 
 To realize equality among Muslims and to seek the legal judgements found in the Qur'an and Sunnah, and to follow the way of salaf in solution to all disputed religious matters
 To combat the so-called  taqlid a'ma (blind acceptance) which conflicts with both aql (reason) and naql (the Qur'an and Hadith)
 To spread Islamic sciences and Arab culture as approved by God
 To attempt to create mutual understanding between Indonesian Muslims and the Arabs

Some of the efforts of the organization are to establish of schools, orphanages, nursing homes and hospitals.

References

Indonesian National Awakening
Islamic organizations based in Indonesia
Islamic organizations established in 1914
Islamic education in Indonesia